The Ungarie Football Netball Club (nicknamed The Magpies) is an Australian rules football and netball club that plays in the Northern Riverina Football Netball League (NRFNL). Formed in 1916, the Magpies are most famous for producing the Daniher brothers (Terry, Neale, Anthony and Chris), as well as Ben Fixter.

History

Formation and early years 
The Ungarie Football Club was formed in 1916, forty-four years after the founding of Ungarie in 1872. 

The Magpies' existence first saw them play against Blow Clear in friendly social games in 1916 and played in the "Cup" competition in 1917 and 1918. 

1917 after which the Ungarie-Girral Australian Rules Football Association was formed in 1918. Five years later, the Magpies won their only Ungarie-Girral Australian Rules Football Association premiership in 1923. One year later, the Ungarie-Girral Australian Rules Football Association amalgamated with the Lake Cargelligo Australian Rules Football Association to form the Northern Riverina Australian Rules Football Association (NRARFA).

20th century 
The Magpies enjoyed their first eighty-four years of existence, winning forty-one premierships across six grades of football and netball, with these being:
 Seniors: 1923, 1935, 1950, 1956, 1959, 1960, 1961, 1974, 1978, 1979, 1983, 1985, 1986, 1999
 Under 16/17s: 1974, 1975, 1976, 1977, 1978, 1981, 1982, 1986, 1987, 1990, 1991, 1992, 1995, 1996
 Under 13s (Football): 1981, 1982, 1983, 1987, 1988, 1992, 1994
 A-Grade: 1993, 1997, 1998, 1999
 B-Grade: 1995
 Under 13s/14s (Netball): 1998

21st century 
Since the beginning of the 21st century, the Magpies have continued to enjoy their existence, winning nineteen premierships across six grades of football and netball, with these being:
 Seniors: 2000, 2001, 2015
 Under 17s: 2009
 Under 13s/14s: 2001, 2006, 2011
 Under 12s: 2002, 2009
 A-Grade: 2000, 2001, 2005, 2006, 2007, 2008, 2009, 2013, 2014
 B-Grade: 2000

Club honours

Football

Seniors 

 Ungarie-Girral Australian Rules Football Association Premierships: (1)

 1923

 NRFL Premierships: (16)

 1935, 1950, 1956, 1959, 1960, 1961, 1974, 1978, 1979, 1983, 1985, 1986, 1999, 2000, 2001, 2015

 NRFL Runners-Up: (7)

 1982, 1984, 1990, 1994, 1995, 1998, 2003

 NRFL Minor Premierships: (11)

 1978, 1979, 1982, 1983, 1984, 1985, 1986, 1990, 1995, 1999, 2000

 Undefeated in Home & Away season: (8)

 1978, 1979, 1982, 1983, 1984, 1985, 1986, 1995

Under 16s/17s 
 NRFL Premierships: (15)

 1974, 1975, 1976, 1977, 1978, 1981, 1982, 1986, 1987, 1990, 1991, 1992, 1995, 1996, 2009

 NRFL Runners-Up: (2)

 2008, 2011

 NRFL Minor Premierships: (2)

 1991, 2009

 Undefeated in Home & Away season: (1)

 2009

Under 13s/14s 
 NRFL Premierships: (10)

 1981, 1982, 1983, 1987, 1988, 1992, 1994, 2001, 2006, 2011

 NRFL Runners-Up: (1)

 2015

Under 12s 

 NRFL Premierships: (2)

 2002, 2009

 NRFL Runners-Up: (4)

 2005, 2006, 2007, 2008

Netball

A-Grade 

 NRNL Premierships: (13)

 1993, 1997, 1998, 1999, 2000, 2001, 2005, 2006, 2007, 2008, 2009, 2013, 2014

 NRNL Runners-Up: (1)

 2011

B-Grade 

 NRNL Premierships: (2)

 1995, 2000

Under 13s/14s 

 NRNL Premierships: (1)

 1998

External links 
 Northern Riverina FL

Further reading 
 Daniher, Terry Daniher, Neale Daniher, Anthony Daniher and Chris Daniher. The Danihers: The Story of Football's Favourite Family. Sydney: Allen & Unwin, 2009.

References

Australian rules football clubs in New South Wales
1916 establishments in Australia
Australian rules football clubs established in 1916